Ulmicola is a genus of true bugs belonging to the family Coreidae.

The species of this genus are found in Europe.

Species:
 Ulmicola spinipes (Fallén, 1807)

References

Coreidae